Badminton Europe (BE) is the governing body of badminton in Europe. It is one of the five continental bodies under the flag of the Badminton World Federation (BWF). It  has 53 member associations and 1 associate member. It was founded on 27 September 1967 in Frankfurt, Germany.

At its annual meeting held on 8 April 2006 the members decided to change the name from European Badminton Union, to Badminton Europe.

Presidents

Member associations

 Albania
 Armenia
 Austria
 Azerbaijan
 Belarus (not in good standing)
 Belgium
 Bosnia and Herzegovina
 Bulgaria
 Croatia
 Cyprus
 Czech Republic
 Denmark
 England
 Estonia
 Faroe Islands
 Finland
 France
 Georgia
 Germany
 Gibraltar
 Greece
 Greenland
 Hungary
 Iceland
 Ireland
 Israel
 Italy
 Kosovo
 Latvia
 Liechtenstein
 Lithuania
 Luxembourg
 North Macedonia
 Malta
 Moldova
 Monaco
 Montenegro
 Netherlands
 Norway
 Poland
 Portugal
 Romania
 Russia (not in good standing)
 Scotland
 Serbia
 Slovak Republic
 Slovenia
 Spain
 Sweden
 Switzerland
 Turkey
 Ukraine
 Wales

Associate members
 Isle of Man

Tournaments
European Championships
European Para Badminton Championships 
European Men's and Women's Team Championships
European Mixed Team Championships
European Junior Championships
European U17 Championships
European U15 Championships
European Senior Badminton Championships 
European Circuit
European Club Championships

Two events were discontinued, they are:
Helvetia Cup, European B Team Badminton Championships
Finlandia Cup, European B Junior Team Badminton Championships

References

External links
Official website

Badminton organizations
Sports governing bodies in Europe
Badminton World Federation
Sports organizations established in 1967
Badminton in Europe
1967 establishments in Europe